The 2010 Women's Pan-American Volleyball Cup was the ninth edition of the annual women's volleyball tournament, played by eleven countries from 18–26 June 2010 in Rosarito and Tijuana, Mexico. The intercontinental event served as a qualifier for the 2011 FIVB World Grand Prix and 2010 Final Four.

Competing Nations

Squads

Preliminary round

Group A

|}

Group B

|}

Final round

Championship bracket

5th–10th places bracket

Classification 5–10

Quarterfinals

Classification 9

Classification 5–8

Semifinals

Classification 7–8, 5–6

Finals

Final ranking

Dominican Republic, Peru, the United States, Cuba, Argentina and Brazil qualified for the 2011 FIVB World Grand Prix.
Dominican Republic, Peru and Argentina qualified along with Mexico for the 2010 Final Four.

Individual awards

Most Valuable Player

Best Scorer

Best Spiker

Best Blocker

Best Server

Best Digger

Best Setter

Best Receiver

Best Libero

References

External links
 Results

Women's Pan-American Volleyball Cup
P
V
International volleyball competitions hosted by Mexico